Events in the year 2021 in Nauru.

Incumbents
 President: Lionel Aingimea 
 Speaker of Parliament: Marcus Stephen

Events 
Ongoing – COVID-19 pandemic in Oceania

January
 29 January – Former Chief Justice of Fiji Daniel Fatiaki is sworn in as Chief Justice of Nauru.

March
 8 March – The first Nauruan High Commissioner to Australia Camilla Solomon presents her credentials to Governor-General David Hurley.

April
9 April – President Aingimea, Parliament Speaker Stephen, and Chief Justice Fatiaki along with each of their spouses all receive the first dose of the COVID-19 vaccine on the launch day for COVID-19 vaccination.

July
 1 July – The Parliament of Nauru becomes autonomous, with the Speaker of Parliament gaining the ability to set parliamentary requirements.
 10 July – Nauru unveils a World War II monument, dedicated to the Nauruans exiled to Truk in 1946 during the Japanese occupation of Nauru.

October
 6 October – Australia closes its refugee detention center in Papua New Guinea, effectively shifting all operations to its detention center in Nauru.
 7 October – Australian High Commissioner Helen Cheney presents her credentials to President Aingimea.

Deaths
29 November – Kinza Clodumar, President of Nauru (1997–1998), (b. 1945)

See also

COVID-19 in Oceania

References

 
2020s in Nauru
Years of the 21st century in Nauru
Nauru
Nauru